Mandirajakulon is a village in the town Mandiraja Banjarnegara Regency, Central Java Province, Indonesia. This village has an area of 177,97 hectares and a population of 5.652 inhabitants in 2010.

References

External links
 Banjarnegara Regency Official Website
 BPS Kabupaten Banjarnegara

Banjarnegara Regency
Villages in Central Java